This is a list of television programs currently broadcast (in first-run or reruns), scheduled to be broadcast or formerly broadcast on Televisão Independente.

Current programming

Original programming

News and information
Diário da Manhã (September 15, 2003 – present)
Jornal da Uma (September 15, 2003 – present)
Jornal das 8 (2011 – present)
Os Comentários de Marcelo Rebelo de Sousa (2011 – 2015)
Repórter TVI (2011 – present)

Telenovelas
A Única Mulher (March 15, 2015 – present)
Santa Bárbara (2015 – present)

Reality shows
A Quinta (October 3, 2015 – present)

Sports
UEFA Champions League

Talk shows
A Tarde é Sua (January 3, 2011 – present)
Somos Portugal (2012 – present)
Você na TV! (September 13, 2004 – present)

Others
Autores
Euromilhões (2004 – present)
Filmes TVI 
Missa - Oitavo Dia 
Querido, Mudei a Casa!

Reruns

Telenovelas
Mundo Meu (2015 – present)
Sonhos Traídos (2015 – present)

Kids
Inspector Max (March 14, 2004 – 2005, first-run; 2005 – present, reruns)
O Bando dos Quatro (2008 first-run; 2013 – present, reruns)

Acquired programming

TV shows/sitcoms
Glee (April 10, 2010 – present)
Hawaii Five-O (April 15, 2012 – present)
Psych (2014 – present)

Kids
Curious George
Dora the Explorer
Fanboy & Chum Chum
Mia and Me
The New Woody Woodpecker Show

Televisão Independente original programming